Bhindawas is a village in Jhajjar district, Haryana, India. It is about 15 km from Jhajjar. It is in Matenhail sub-district. Bhindawas Wildlife Sanctuary is nearby. The village was founded by Bhinda and Puhania Ahirs a few centuries ago. Army and agriculture were the main profession of people but now many have migrated to nearby cities and work in various government and private organizations.

Demographics of 2011
As of 2011 India census, Bhindawas had a population of 2074 in 422 households. Males (1088) constitute 52.45%  of the population and females (986) 47.54%. Bhindawas has an average literacy (1450) rate of 69.91%, lower than the national average of 74%: male literacy (847) is 58.41%, and female literacy (603) is 41.58% of total literates (1450). In Bhindawas, Jhajjar, 12.63% of the population is under 6 years of age (262).

Adjacent villages
Chandol
Dhakla
Surehti
rayia
dawala

References

Villages in Jhajjar district